Kulla Agent 000 is a 1972 Indian Kannada-language mystery comedy film directed by K. S. L. Swamy and produced and written by Dwaraka Films. The film stars Dwarakish, Udaykumar and Jyothi Lakshmi.

Cast 
 Dwarakish
 Jyothi Lakshmi
 Udaykumar
 Vajramuni
 R. Sampath
 Shakti Prasad
 Ranganath
 B. Jaya

Soundtrack 
The music of the film was composed by Rajan–Nagendra and lyrics written by Chi. Udaya Shankar. The song "Aadoo Aata Aadoo" was sung the legendary playback singer Kishore Kumar for the first time in Kannada cinema.

References 

1972 films
1970s Kannada-language films
Indian mystery comedy-drama films
Indian detective films
Indian black-and-white films
Films scored by Rajan–Nagendra
Films directed by K. S. L. Swamy
Indian spy comedy films
Indian remakes of foreign films